Sir Graham Collingwood "Mont" Liggins  (24 June 192624 August 2010) was a New Zealand medical scientist. A specialist in obstetrical research, he is best known for his pioneering use of hormone injections (antenatal steroids) in 1972 to accelerate the lung growth of premature babies. This made it possible for many preterm babies with lung problems to survive.

Liggins was educated at the University of Auckland obtaining a PhD in 1969. His doctoral thesis was titled The Role of the foetal adrenal glands in the mechanism of initiation of parturition in the ewe. In the 1983 Queen's Birthday Honours, Liggins was appointed a Commander of the Order of the British Empire for services to medical research. He was made a Knight Bachelor, also for services to medical research, in the 1991 Queen's Birthday Honours.

The Liggins Institute was named in his honour.

Liggins died on 24 August 2010, aged 84, following a long illness.

References

1926 births
2010 deaths
New Zealand Fellows of the Royal Society
Fellows of the Royal Society of New Zealand
New Zealand Knights Bachelor
New Zealand obstetricians
Place of death missing
People from Thames, New Zealand
New Zealand Commanders of the Order of the British Empire
New Zealand medical researchers
20th-century New Zealand scientists